Gruia is a district of Cluj-Napoca in Romania, located on the Cetăţuia hill. It is essentially a residential neighbourhood, with a large number of villas. The Dr. Constantin Rădulescu Stadium, home ground of CFR 1907 Cluj football team, is situated in this district.

Districts of Cluj-Napoca